Raynetta Mañees is an African-American romance novelist and entertainer.

Personal life
Raynetta Mañees was born and raised in Detroit, and is a graduate of Cass Technical High School and Wayne State University, with a degree in Mass Communication. She retired as an executive administrator in the US Federal Government after a 28-year career. Mañees now writes full-time, as well as owns an online antique and collectible shop, "Raynetta's Romantiques."

Mañees is the author of six published novels, all of which were also released as e-Books. Manees is currently living in Michigan and working on her seventh print novel.

Writing career
Mañees had published several short stories and newspaper articles before All for Love, her first novel, was printed in 1996.

Her second novel, Wishing on a Star, was also a bestseller and was positively received by critics.

Mañees' third novel, Follow Your Heart, was rated a 4½ star Gold Medal Top Pick classic by Romantic Times. The novel was also awarded the “Award of Excellence” from RomanceInColor.com.

Romantic Times rated her fourth release, A Mother's Touch, released in May 1999, with four stars. It is an anthology, which contains Manees’ novella "All the Way Home." Also in 1999, Mañees released her fourth full-length novel, Fantasy.

Her fifth novel, Heart of the Matter, reached the top ten of Amazon's list of best-selling multicultural romances.

Other artistic work
Mañees performance career as a vocalist began at the age of five. She has performed as a solo artist in numerous venues in Detroit, Chicago, Lansing, and the Caribbean. Her singing led to stage performances in musicals, which in turn led to numerous non-musical acting roles.

Mañees was, from 1994 to 1996, a member of the Board of Directors of the Riverwalk Theater of Lansing, Michigan, and she has appeared at the Riverwalk in several productions, including "West Side Story", and was the leading lady in the Afro-American drama "Sty of the Blind Pig." She also appeared in the role of Mrs. Murphy in the Pulitzer Prize–winning play "JB" at the Spotlight Theater in Grand Ledge, Michigan.

Mañees’ acting led to an invitation to do commercial radio, and she was for two years an on-air personality on AM 1180, WXLA, in Lansing. She has also performed in radio and television commercials.

Works
 Heart of the matter, released January 2002, 
 Fantasy, released August 1999, 
 A Mother's Touch, an anthology containing Manees' novella, "All The Way Home", released May 1999, 
 Follow Your Heart, released September 1998,  
 Wishing on a Star, released August 1997, 
 All for Love, released September 1996,

References

Raynetta Manees Website

External links
 
 

Year of birth missing (living people)
Living people
20th-century American novelists
21st-century American novelists
20th-century American women writers
21st-century American women writers
American romantic fiction writers
American women novelists
Cass Technical High School alumni
People from Southfield, Michigan
Wayne State University alumni